John de Seton of Parbroath (died 1327) was a Scottish noble.

Life
Seton is said to be the fourth son of Alexander de Seton and Christian le Cheyne. His father bestowed on him Elizabeth Ramsay, the heiress of Parbroath, after Alexander was appointed as her guardian.

Marriage and issue
John, married Elizabeth Ramsay and they are known to have the following issue:
Alexander Seton

Citations

References

Year of birth unknown
1327 deaths
14th-century Scottish people